Oier Lazkano López (born 7 November 1999, in Vitoria-Gasteiz) is a Spanish cyclist, who currently rides for UCI WorldTeam .

Major results
2017
 4th Time trial, National Junior Road Championships
2020
 1st Stage 3 Volta a Portugal
 10th Overall Belgrade–Banja Luka
2021
  Combativity award Stage 5 Vuelta a España
2022
 1st Stage 2 Tour de Wallonie
 2nd Time trial, National Road Championships

Grand Tour general classification results timeline

References

External links

1999 births
Living people
Spanish male cyclists
Sportspeople from Vitoria-Gasteiz
Cyclists from the Basque Country (autonomous community)
21st-century Spanish people